Peak Mountain, also called Copper Mountain, est. It is part of the narrow, linear Metacomet Ridge that extends from Long Island Sound near New Haven, Connecticut, north through the Connecticut River Valley of Massachusetts to the Vermont border. The mountain is also known for its microclimate ecosystems, rare plant communities, and as a seasonal raptor migration path. It is traversed by the  Metacomet Trail.

Geography
The name Peak Mountain applies to the entire ridge while Copper Mountain may apply to the entire ridge or just a ledge, on the south side of the ridge. The Metacomet Ridge continues north from Peak Mountain to become West Suffield Mountain and south to become Hatchet Hill. 

The west side of Peak Mountain drains into Salmon Brook, then into the Farmington River, thence to the Connecticut River and Long Island Sound; the east side drains into the Connecticut River.

Peak Mountain is located directly in line with the approach to Runway 15 at Bradley International Airport. In 1995, American Airlines Flight 1572 clipped trees near the summit while landing at the airport.

Geology and environment
Peak Mountain, like much of the Metacomet Ridge, is composed of basalt, also called traprock, a volcanic rock. The mountain formed near the end of the Triassic Period with the rifting apart of the North American continent from Africa and Eurasia. Lava welled up from the rift and solidified into sheets of strata hundreds of feet thick. Subsequent faulting and earthquake activity tilted the strata, creating the cliffs and ridgeline of Peak Mountain. Hot, dry upper slopes, cool, moist ravines, and mineral-rich ledges of basalt talus produce a combination of microclimate ecosystems on the mountain that support plant and animal species uncommon in greater Connecticut. Peak Mountain is also an important raptor migration path; Hawkcount.org has recorded over 20 different species of raptor migrating via Peak Mountain including the bald eagle, American kestrel, golden eagle, and peregrine falcon. (See Metacomet Ridge for more information on the geology and ecosystem of Peak Mountain)

Recreation and conservation
Peak Mountain is traversed by the Metacomet Trail, (maintained by the Connecticut Forest and Park Association), which extends from the Hanging Hills of Meriden, Connecticut, to the Massachusetts border. The mountain is open to hiking, bird watching, snowshoeing and other passive pursuits. Views from the summit include the Barn Door Hills and Manitook Mountain. 

Peak Mountain provides a bird's eye view of Old Newgate Prison, managed as a tourist attraction since 1860, a pre-American Revolutionary War prison and copper mine. Old Newgate, a National Historic Landmark, was named after London's Newgate Prison.  Old Newgate Prison is America's first copper mine and the first state prison in the United States. 
The ecosystem and ridgeline of Peak Mountain are most threatened by development and quarrying. In 2000, Peak Mountain was included in a study by the National Park Service for the designation of a new National Scenic Trail now tentatively called the New England National Scenic Trail, which would include the Metacomet-Monadnock Trail in Massachusetts and the Mattabesett Trail and Metacomet Trail trails in Connecticut.

The East Granby Land Trust has played an active part in the conservation of Peak Mountain and its viewshed.

See also
 Metacomet Ridge
 Metacomet Trail
 American Airlines Flight 1572
 Adjacent summits:

References

 Farnsworth, Elizabeth J. "Metacomet-Mattabesett Trail Natural Resource Assessment."  2004. PDF wefile cited November 1, 2007. 
 Connecticut Walk Book East: The Trail Guide to the Blue Blazed Hiking Trails of Eastern Connecticut (2005) 19th edition.  Rockfall, Connecticut:  The Connecticut Forest and Park Association.
 Raymo, Chet and Raymo, Maureen E. Written in Stone: A Geologic History of the Northeastern United States. Globe Pequot, Chester, Connecticut, 1989.
 U.S. Congress New England National Scenic Trail Designation Act. 
 Hawkcount.org Peak Mountain count. Cited Dec. 19, 2007
 USGS Windsor Locks topographic 41° 58' 13"N, 72° 44' 24"W (NAD83/WGS84) via Topozone.com.

External links
 Connecticut Forest and Park Association
 NPS brochure for National Scenic Trail proposal.
 East Granby Land Trust

Metacomet Ridge, Connecticut
Protected areas of Hartford County, Connecticut
Mountains of Connecticut
Landforms of Hartford County, Connecticut
Nature reserves in Connecticut